The Well-Intentioned Virus is the eleventh full-length album by metalcore band Zao, released on December 9, 2016. The album features the first studio performance of Russ Cogdell for the first time since 2004's The Funeral of God. The album was released digitally, as well as on CD, vinyl and cassette. On December 1, 2016, the band streamed the whole album.

Lyrical themes
Many of the lyrics have personal meaning to vocalist Daniel Weydant, similar to a majority of the band's previous songs he was involved in. The song "The Weeping Vessel" has to do with the miscarriage of the Weydant's first child. "A Well-Intentioned Virus" deals with people who thought what they were doing was right but were later looked upon as evil. "Broken Pact Blues" deals with Weydant's brother Matt breaking a suicide pact. Other tracks have to deal with mortality, false truths and fever dreams.

Critical reception

Danielle Martin of HM Magazine wrote "Zao has undoubtedly added to their score of culturally-relevant albums with this one. With its veteran backbone, raw voice, and savage-yet-developed cacophony, it will join the ranks of their more memorable releases; it seems the passage of time has only sharpened their aptitude." "The Well-Intentioned Virus is their best album in over a decade, picking up where The Funeral of God left off in terms of quality while nailing the progression they've been pursuing since." writes Bradley Zorgdrager of Exclaim. Mason Beard of Indie Vision Music wrote "The band is still the same as ever, just back with a new sound. The band still has the heart-felt message of all the way back when none of these guys were in the band. The message has only changed ever slightly. They sound like Zao." Michael Weaver of Jesus Freak Hideout wrote "The album isn't marketed for a Christian audience, and while there isn't any major offensive material here, I'd still recommend that some caution be given due to the dark nature of the content. Hopefully this marks a full reunion for Zao and not just a one-off performance. Enjoy this metal gem and relish the return of Zao." while Jeremy Barnes wrote "Zao have broken a seven-year silence with another strong addition to their famed discography and have gifted the metal genre an appropriate closing note for an outstanding year." Grymm of Angry Metal Guy reports " I just hope the next album takes less than seven years, but this was well worth the wait. Highly recommended." Wookubus of Theprp stated "In a way, it’s almost fitting though as nothing about this album feels labored or sterile. Much like its namesake would suggest, there’s a vicious organic corruption here that rapidly spreads and takes over, will you be able to endure it?" Where's the Beef wrote "The Well-Intentioned Virus is a fantastic example of what an album should sound like after a long hiatus.  Show the fans that you had a real reason for coming back.  There are some moments that could have used a bit more polish, but I can look past them given the grade-A Kobe beef held within." Matthew Michel of Metal Utopia wrote "Zao means “alive” in Greek. The band has returned with confidence and stayed true to its name. The Well-Intentioned Virus is a contender for the best metalcore album of the year. In fact, it may help breathe new life into the hardcore scene. Suddenly, you remember the minuscule replicators dormant within your blood. The virus exults in its new-found freedom; it prepares itself and surges forward in a new effort at rebirth. It’s still there, ready to break out. You’re unsure of its motivation. Can you feel it? You will."

Track listing

Personnel 
Zao
 Dan Weyandt – vocals
 Scott Mellinger – guitar, vocals
 Russ Cogdell – guitar
 Martin Lunn – bass, vocals
 Jeff Gretz – drums

Production
Matt Kerley – artwork
 Dave Hidek – mixing, engineer
 Dave Cerminara – editing, post-production
 Daniel Carballal – editing, post-production
 Liz Klehm – editing, post-production
 Al Torrence – editing, post-production
 Vaughan Woosley – editing, post-production
 Garret Haines – mastering
 Ben Buckner – art layout
 Josh Bonati – lacquers

References

Zao (American band) albums
2016 albums